Barry Bodine (born November 11, 1977) is an American former stock car racing driver. He is the son of Geoffrey Bodine, and the nephew of Todd and Brett Bodine.

Racing career

Busch Series
Bodine made his Busch debut in 1998, running the #05 Miccosukee Chevy at Homestead-Miami Speedway, starting 29th and finishing 31st.

Barry was scheduled to run about ten races in 1999, running his father's #64 Luxury Travel Motorcoaches Chevy. However, the team struggled to qualify and the plan was scrapped after Bodine only made three races. After finishes of 29th (Texas) and 25th (Nashville) Bodine had his best career finish of 12th at Talladega Superspeedway.

Craftsman Truck Series
Bodine made his CTS debut in 1995, driving his father's #07 truck at the age of 17. Bodine first ran at Martinsville, where he started 28th, but crashed out to 30th. He ran two more races in 1996 in the #07 QVC Ford. Despite a last place start at Martinsville, Bodine finished in 20th. His other outing was at North Wilkesboro, where he finished 23rd.

Bodine returned to competition seven times in 1997. He earned four top-20 finishes, with a best of 12th place at California. He also had two top-5 starts, the best being a 3rd at Las Vegas. However, he crashed out of that race, ending a run of four top-20s in five races. He finished 31st in 1998 points, as he completed eleven races, the most of his CTS career. He had his best career finish of 11th at Homestead-Miami and matched his best career start with a 3rd place start at Texas.

Bodine returned to the series in 2000, splitting races with his father at Billy Ballew Motorsports. His father Geoffrey, however, was injured in the first race of the season at Daytona, and Barry's schedule was reduced to three starts, completing three straight events after Daytona. He had finishes of 13th at Miami, 17th at Phoenix and 23rd at Mesa Marin.

In 2001, he ran a pair of races for Team Racing, making his debut in the season opener at Daytona. However, he was quickly involved in an accident and finished 36th. He then moved onto Homestead-Miami, where he earned a nice 12th-place finish. However, the deal did not materialize in any more races, and Bodine did not make any more starts.

Bodine ran three races in 2002, two for E.J. Prescott and one for Team Racing. He finished both races for EJP, with a 26th at Richmond and a 16th at Homestead. He was 31st in the race for Team Racing at Texas.

Bodine has not raced in any series of NASCAR since the season finale of the CTS in 2002.

Motorsports career results

NASCAR
(key) (Bold – Pole position awarded by qualifying time. Italics – Pole position earned by points standings or practice time. * – Most laps led.)

Busch Series

Craftsman Truck Series

References

External links 

Barry Bodine fan page
Draco Performance Barry Bodine's current performance automotive business, located in Cornelius, NC

1977 births
Living people
NASCAR drivers
People from Guilford County, North Carolina
Racing drivers from North Carolina
Bodine family